Recreational trawlers are pleasure boats that resemble fishing trawlers. They are also be called cruising trawlers or trawler yachts. Within the category, however, are many types and styles of vessels.

A fishing trawler for example, always has a displacement hull for load-carrying capacity. Recreational trawlers, on the other hand, are as likely to have a semi-displacement hull. However, with the rising cost of fuel and the lower fuel consumption (though also lower speed) offered by displacement hulls, they are gaining popularity among some buyers. These displacement models typically have a cruising speed of  depending on the boat length.

Details
Recreational trawlers are also subject to fashion. For example, many United States production recreational trawlers have a style that includes features such as a raised pilothouse or offset deckhouse.

A popular feature is a "Portuguese bridge", which consists of a walkway behind the foredeck, in front and to the sides of the pilothouse windows, separated from the foredeck by a (generally) waist-high bulwark. The purpose of the Portuguese bridge is to deflect green water from slamming against the forward windows of the pilothouse.  It gives a semi-sheltered area outside the pilothouse while underway. A secondary benefit is that it provides a "safe area" or handhold when it is necessary to be on the foredeck in inclement weather. And lastly, it provides additional storage space for lines, fire extinguisher, spare anchor, drogue, etc., if the builder has provided access doors and lockers on the inside of the bridge.

Most are built for long term cruising of regional and worldwide destinations. Combined with large fuel tanks, they can cruise far before needing to be refuelled. They can be home for between 2 and 8 persons for many days and can be a permanent home.

Usually trawlers have a single engine, though twin-engine installations are also available from some builders. They have a large fuel capacity. When combined with the slower speeds of a displacement hull, these features give such vessels far greater range and economy than similarly sized planing boats. A large engine room under the main cabin is another feature of true cruising trawlers. Many also include a diesel generator of 5–20 kW to power domestic appliances, bow thrusters, dinghy cranes, and similar equipment.

In the United States recreational trawlers are made by over 70 builders and manufacturers.

See also
Kadey-Krogen Yachts
Nordhavn
North Pacific Yachts
Victory Tug
Fishing trawler
Naval trawler

References

Nautical terminology
Motorboats